Limnodea, with the common name Ozark grass, is a genus of North American plants in the grass family. The type species is Greenia arkansana Nutt..

The only known species of the annual bunchgrass is Limnodea arkansana.

Distribution
Limnodea arkansana is native: to northeastern Mexico in Coahuila and Tamaulipas states; and to the South-Central/Midwestern and Southeastern United States, in Arkansas (including the Ozarks), Oklahoma,  East Texas, Louisiana, Mississippi, Alabama, South Carolina, and the Florida Panhandle.

It grows in dry and usually sandy soils, in prairie, open woodland, and river bank habitats; and in disturbed areas. Along the Gulf Coast it is found on upper beaches where shells accumulate, and on maritime shell mounds and middens.

References

External links
  USDA Plants Profile for Limnodea arkansana (Ozark grass)
  The Online Grass Manual: Limnodea + Limnodea arkansana

Pooideae
Bunchgrasses of North America
Grasses of Mexico
Grasses of the United States
Flora of Northeastern Mexico
Flora of the United States
Flora of the Southeastern United States
Grasses of Alabama
Native grasses of Oklahoma
Native grasses of Texas
Monotypic Poaceae genera
Plants described in 1835
Taxa named by Thomas Nuttall